African emigrants to Italy include Italian citizens and residents originally from Africa. Immigrants from Africa officially residing in Italy in 2015 numbered about 1,000,000 residents. Afro-Italians (Afroitaliani) are born and are raised in Italy, citizen of African descent or of mixed African and Italian roots.

In 2014 over 170,000 migrants arrived which represented the biggest influx of people into one country in European Union history. A large percentage of them arrive via Africa.

African migrants specifically use Libyan coasts to travel across the Mediterranean Sea in large numbers, hoping to land on Italian shores. Although departing from Libya, most are from Ghana, Senegal, Nigeria and Eritrea. The route is dangerous and often unsuccessful; in 2015, 2,000 people died crossing the Mediterranean and the  Libyan coast guard intercepted many of the boats transporting the migrants from Africa to Italy. As this route has gained more and more attention throughout the years, smugglers have started to use alternate routes such as Egypt, the Balkan route from Greece, and a very risky route from mountain passes in Albania.

In 2016, Italy's finance minister pushed for financial compensation from the European Union for his country's financial losses because of mass migration. As of 2016, the European Union had put forth 1.8 billion euros for the entirety of Africa's refugee efforts in Europe.

Countries of origin

North Africa
The largest group of immigrants from Africa are  Arabs/Berbers from North Africa, numbering 641,085 official residents in 2016. By country of origin, most of these recent arrivals are from Morocco (437,485), Tunisia (95,645), Egypt (109,871) and Algeria (71,765). Italy also has a number of immigrants from Libya (1,819), territories where Italian expatriates had a presence during the colonial period.

Sub-Saharan Africans

Compared to Maghrebis/Berbers from North Africa, the percentage of Sub-Saharan Africans (most of them Christians) as a proportion of immigrants to Italy from Africa is 35.7% (370,068 official residents in 2015). Most come from Nigeria (98,176), Senegal (77,264) and Ghana (48,637). There are also smaller numbers from Eritrea (9,579), from Ethiopia (8,000) and from Somalia (7,903).

Notable immigrants to Italy
The following is a list of notable people of African birth who later immigrated to Italy and resided there, either wholly or at least part time.

Sports

Politicians

Music
Saba Anglana - singer and actress born in Somalia
Bello FiGo - singer born in Ghana
Franco Califano - singer born in Libya
Nour Eddine - singer and filmmaker born in Morocco
Laïoung, rapper and music producer, (born 1992, in Brussels to) Italian father and British mother of Sierra Leonean origin
Bruno Lauzi -  singer born in Eritrea
 or Maruego - rapper, (born 1992 in Morocco), grew up in Milan, naturalized Italian

Communications and other media
Khaby Lame - prominent TikTokker of Senegalese background

Acting, television and filmmaking
Remo Girone - actor born in Eritrea
Sandra Milo - actress born in Tunisia
Claudia Cardinale -  actress born in Tunisia
Zeudi Araya - Eritrean-Italian actress
Edwige Fenech - actress born in Algeria of Maltese father and Italian mother
Youma Diakite - model born in Mali

Community activists
Josephine Bakhita (c. 1869–1947), Catholic religious sister, born in Sudan; declared a saint by the Catholic Church in 2000
Michele Amatore (1826 - 1883), born in Sudan, enslaved in childhood, later freed and established in Italy; soldier and sharpshooter in Piedmontese army, attaining rank of captain. Decorated for distinguished service in Sicily during a cholera epidemic.
Adel Smith (1960–2014), controversial Italian anti-Christian activist. Born Emilio Smith in Alexandria, Egypt to an Italian father and an Egyptian mother; raised in Italy as a Catholic, he later converted to Islam

See also

Italian Africa
Italians in Africa
Black people in Ancient Roman history
African admixture in Europe

References 

 
Ethnic groups in Italy
Italian people of African descent